The Clavinova is a long-running line of digital pianos created by the Yamaha Corporation. The name is a portmanteau of the two words Clavier meaning 'keyboard instrument' and nova meaning 'new'.

It is similar in function to an acoustic piano but also includes many features common to various keyboards, such as the ability to save/load songs and also to play demo songs, including some original Yamaha compositions. Each model has the availability to play a variety of voices. More recent models can be connected to a computer via USB or wireless network for music production or interactive piano lesson programs.

In 2018, the Clavinova celebrated the 35th anniversary of its invention in 1983.

Technical information
All current (and many past) Clavinovas (CLP and CVP-Series) feature Yamaha's 'Graded Hammer' technology, a mechanical system of small metal hammers, weighted to be similar to those of an acoustic piano, which activates a digital pressure sensor that then translates into sound. This technology has contributed to the success of the Clavinova as a more affordable substitute for an acoustic piano. The graded action is intended to reproduce more accurately the varying weights of the hammers of an acoustic piano where the hammers vary in weight from the bass section to the treble. Higher-end models, such as the CVP-600 Series from 2012, incorporate real wood keys and linear grading for added realism.
 
The built-in synthesizer produces the sound. Early Clavinova models used FM synthesis. Later models use sample-based synthesis to produce the sound. Information comes in a MIDI or similar format either directly from the piano keyboard or a stored source (from within the piano or via a computer or external sequencer). The synthesizer can imitate a large array of acoustic instruments, electronic instruments and other sound effects. Recent models of CVP Clavinova have hundreds of such voices.  These usually include many types of pianos and organs, string, percussion, brass and woodwind instruments, as well as modern and vintage synthesizer sounds, sampled effects etc. The more recent CVP models also feature many accompaniment styles, ranging from traditional dance and classical orchestration to more modern club, pop, rock, big band and jazz styles.

As of July 2020, the current line of Clavinova CLP models is the CLP-700 series, and the current Clavinova CVP models are the CVP-800 series. In August 2017, Yamaha introduced a new line of tablet computer-enabled Clavinovas, the CSP series, which is designed for use with Yamaha's SmartPianist app to access and control features of the instrument.

Graded hammer
The various graded or progressively weighted keys are:

 Graded Hammer Standard (GHS), formerly Hammer Effect (HE) or Action Effect (AE)
 Graded Hammer (GH or sometimes GHE), somewhat heavier than GHS. GH is also closer to the weight of real piano keys.
 Graded Hammer 3 (GH3), like GH, but GH3 incorporate a third sensor, thus making the key respond more like "grand piano" behaviour. GH3 allows the player to trigger the sound when depressed a second time, even when the note is still decaying, and the player has not completely released the key after the first push of the key. This makes some techniques such as a soft legato "trill" easier to execute.
 Graded Hammer 3X (GH3X) keyboard features an "escapement" mechanism that reproduces a slight clicking sensation near the bottom of the key travel. It has been designed in such a way that the click is discernible only on the lightest keystrokes, similar to the keyboard of a grand piano.
 Natural Wood (NW) is graded like the GH3 but also uses spruce wood to make the feeling even closer to that of the acoustic grand piano.
 Natural Wood X (NWX) provides the keys of the NW keyboard, yet also has escapement, giving an even more accurate feel.
 GrandTouch Keyboard has a longer key length. The longer distance between the edge of the key and its pivot point means that it requires less strength to push down.
 88-key Linear Graded Hammers provide 88 levels of gradation (each key has its own weight). With NWX, it has the most accurate feel of any of the Clavinovas, although also found on some NW keyboards.

Keyboard "feel" feature matrix for current models
From Yamaha Clavinova microsite.   From Yamaha Product Spec page.

Tone feature matrix for three past generations and current models

From Yamaha Clavinova microsite.  
From Clavinova Spec page.

History
From Clavinova's 35th anniversary website.

Predecessors (YP and CV)

YP (CVP Predecessor) 

 1983: YP-10, YP-20, YP-30, YP-40 – provided the "Stereo Symphonic effect" showing depth feeling to perform in concert halls and live houses, first pianos on the series.

CV (CLP Predecessor) 
 1984: CV-100, CV-300

CVP and CGP models 
 1985: CVP-3, CVP-5, CVP-7 – First CVP series Clavinova
 1987: CVP-6, CVP-8, CVP-10, CVP-100MA, CVP-100PE
 1988: CVP-20
 1989: CVP-30, CVP-50, CVP-70
 1991: CVP-25*, CVP-35, CVP-45, CVP-55, CVP-65, CVP-75
 1993: CVP-83, CVP-85, CVP-87, CVP-89
 1995: CVP-49, CVP-59, CVP-69, CVP-79 – added LCD on all models except CVP-49, and introduced LCD buttons.
 1997: CVP-92, CVP-94, CVP-96, CVP-98, CVP-555 – First modern design button LCD, Organ Combo (predecessor to Organ Flutes! voices). Based on the PSR-8000 and PSR-740.
 1998: CVP-600
 1999: CVP-103, CVP-105, CVP-107, CVP-109. Based on PSR-740 and PSR-9000.
 2000: CVP-700
 2001: CVP-201, CVP-203, CVP-205, CVP-207, CVP-209 – Introduced most of the current technologies, added first color display, and with the latest button setup. Based on PSR-9000, 9000 Pro and PSR-2100.
 2002: CVP-900
 2003: CVP-202, CVP-204, CVP-206, CVP-208, CVP-210. Based on PSR-2100.
 2004: CVP-301, CVP-303, CVP-305, CVP-309, CVP-307, CVP-309, CVP-309GP – All models have current button display, first GH3 and NW keyboards. Added Mega Voices and based on Tyros/PSR-3000.
 2008: CGP-1000
 2008: CVP-401, CVP-403, CVP-405, CVP-407, CVP-409, CVP-409GP – Added Super Articulation, based on Tyros 2/PSR-S900.
 2009: CVP-501, CVP-503, CVP-505, CVP-509 – Introduced several new keyboard technologies, added S. Articulation 2. Added free play styles. Based on Tyros 3/PSR-S910.
 2013: CVP-601, CVP-605, CVP-609, CVP-609GP – All models have S. Articulation and GH3, added touch screen and RGE sound engine. Based on Tyros 4/PSR-S950.
 2015: CVP-701, CVP-705, CVP-709, CVP-709GP – All models have color displays and synthetic ivory keycaps. Added VRM sound engine and escapement. Based on Tyros 5/PSR-S970.
 2019: CVP-805, CVP-809, CVP-809GP. Based on Genos/PSR-SX900.

CLP models 
History reference.

 1985: CLP-20, CLP-30
 1986: CLP-40, CLP-45, CLP-50, CLP-55, CLP-200, CLP-300
 1987: CLP-100, CLP-100MA, CLP-100PE, CLP-500
 1988: CLP-250, CLP-350, CLP-550, CLP-650
 1989: CLP-570, CLP-650W, CLP-670
 1990: CLP-260, CLP-360, CLP-560, CLP-760
 1992: CLP-121, CLP-122, CLP-123, CLP-124
 1994: CLP-152S, CLP-153S, CLP-153SG, CLP-154S, CLP-155, CLP-157 
 1996: CLP-311, CLP-411, CLP-511, CLP-611, CLP-811, CLP-911
 1997: CLP-555
 1998: CLP-810, CLP-820, CLP-840, CLP-860, CLP-880
 2000: CLP-920, CLP-930, CLP-950, CLP-955, CLP-970, CLP-970A 
 2001: CLP-910, CLP-990
 2002: CLP-110, CLP-120, CLP-130, CLP-150, CLP-170
 2003: CLP-115
 2005: CLP-F01
 2005: CLP-220, CLP-230, CLP-240, CLP-270, CLP-280, CLP-265GP, CLP-295GP
 2008: CLP-320, CLP-330, CLP-340, CLP-370, CLP-380, CLP-S306, CLP-S308
 2011: CLP-430, CLP-440, CLP-465GP, CLP-470, CLP-480, CLP-S406, CLP-S408 - Implemented RGE Sound Engine
 2014: CLP-525, CLP-535, CLP-545, CLP-565GP, CLP-575, CLP-585 - Revised LCD, added VRM
 2017: CLP-625, CLP-635, CLP-645, CLP-665GP, CLP-675, CLP-685
 2018: CLP-695GP
 2020: CLP-735, CLP-745, CLP-765GP, CLP-775, CLP-785, CLP-795GP
 2021: CLP-725

CSP models 

 2017: CSP-150, CSP-170

*Uncertain, please help the wiki by finding correct data.

See also
Piano acoustics

References

External links
Clavinova Digital Pianos (official Yamaha website)

Yamaha digital pianos
Musical instruments invented in the 1980s
Products introduced in 1983